Lowick may refer to:

Lowick, Cumbria
Lowick, Northamptonshire
Lowick, Northumberland
Lowick, Germany, part of Bocholt, Germany

it:Pianeti di Guerre stellari#Lowick